, formerly known as , is a Japanese engineering corporation headquartered in Tokyo, Japan that produces and offers ships, space launch vehicles, aircraft engines, marine diesel engines, gas turbines, gas engines, railway systems, turbochargers for automobiles, plant engineering, industrial machinery, power station boilers and other facilities, suspension bridges and other structures.

IHI is listed on the Tokyo Stock Exchange Section 1.

History 
 1853 – establishment of Ishikawajima Shipyard in the Chuo district of Tokyo.
 1854 - 1856: construction of the Japanese warship Asahi Maru at Ishikawajima shipyard.
 1889 – incorporation of Ishikawajima Shipyard as Ishikawajima Shipbuilding & Engineering Co., Ltd.
 1907 – establishment of Harima Dock Co., Ltd.
 1929 – spinoff of Harima's automobile section as Ishikawajima Automotive Works (later Isuzu through a series of mergers)
 1960 – establishment of Ishikawajima-Harima Heavy Industries Co., Ltd. through a merger of Ishikawajima and Harima
 1995 – IHI and Sumitomo Heavy Industries merged a warship business and established Marine United Ltd. The Uraga Dock Company was the origin in the shipbuilding of Sumitomo Heavy Industries. It was made by Enomoto Takeaki. However, Sumitomo Heavy Industries moved Uraga Dock to Yokosuka in 2003. IHI moved a shipbuilding section to Marine United in 2002 and changed its name to IHI Marine United Ltd. IHI Marine United became the subsidiary of IHI in 2006.
 2000 – purchased Nissan Motor’s Aerospace and Defense Divisions and established IHI Aerospace Co., Ltd.
 2007 – name changed to IHI Corporation.
 2013 – established Japan Marine United Corporation, merging its ship building unit, Marine United Inc., with Universal Shipbuilding Corp. of JFE Holdings after discussion started in April 2008
 2016 – sold all shares of wholly owned IHI Construction Machinery Limited to Kato Works Company Limited.
 2018 – IHI halts manufacturing nuclear reactor parts to focus on aircraft parts, leaving Japan Steel Works as the sole Japanese supplier of reactor parts.

Businesses

Energy and resources
 Energy systems
 Process plants
 Energy storage

Gas turbines
 LM2500
 LM6000

Aircraft engines
IHI develops, manufactures, and maintains aero engines, either by joint projects of which partners include GE Aviation, Pratt & Whitney, and Rolls-Royce Holdings, or the company itself.

In-house development 
Ishikawajima Ne-20
Ishikawajima-Harima J3
Ishikawajima-Harima F3
Ishikawajima-Harima XF5
IHI Corporation F7, F7-10
 IHI Corporation XF9

Joint development 

 IAE V2500
 General Electric GEnx
 General Electric GE90
 General Electric CF34
 Pratt & Whitney PW1100G-JM

Licensed production 

 General Electric T700
 General Electric F110

Parts manufacturing 

 Rolls-Royce Trent

Space products
 S-type Sounding Rocket (S-210, S-310, S-520, SS-520)
 M-V Launch Vehicle
 GX Launch Vehicle (Partner in Galaxy Express Corporation)
 Epsilon Launch Vehicle
 SRB-A solid rocket booster for H-IIA/H-IIB Launch Vehicle
 BT-4 liquid-fuelled apogee motor (used in the Cygnus vehicle which are launched on Atlas V and Antares rockets)

Ships
Shipbuilding was the founding activity of Ishikawajima in 1853.  It remains part of IHI's business activities, although it has been diluted through several mergers with other Japanese shipbuilding companies.

In 1960, Ishikawajima Heavy Industries merged with Harima Shipbuilding & Engineering Company to establish the Ishikawajima-Harima Heavy Industries (IHI).
In 1995, Marine United was established jointly with Sumitomo Heavy Industries.  
In 2013, IHI Marine United was merged with Universal Shipbuilding Corporation owned by the steel company JFE Holdings in order to newly establish a larger firm, Japan Marine United Corporation (JMU), of which IHI remained a shareholder.

In March 2020, Japan Marine United (with 49% of shares) agreed to merge with Imabari Shipbuilding (with 51% of shares) into a joint venture named Nihon Shipyard (NSY), covering all ship types except Liquefied natural gas (LNG) tankers. This agreement became effective in January 2021.
In parallel with the creation of Nihon Shipyard, Imabari Shipbuilding bought 30% of JMU's shares, while IHI and JFE Holdings each kept 35% of JMU's capital. 
The merger between these two Japanese companies resulted in Nihon Shipyard becoming one of the largest marine-engineering and shipbuilding companies in the world, of which IHI remains a shareholder.

IHI Marine United Tokyo shipyard
Ships built at Tokyo:
 , Murasame-class destroyer
 , Murasame class
 , Murasame class
 , Haruna-class destroyer
 , Towada-class replenishment ship
 , Asagiri-class destroyer
 , Asagiri class
 , Asagiri class
 , Hatsuyuki-class destroyer
 , Hatsuyuki class
 , Hatsuyuki class
 , Shirane-class destroyer
 , Shirane class
 , Kongō-class destroyer

IHI Marine United Yokohama shipyard
Ships built at Yokohama:
 , Takanami-class destroyer 
 , Takanami class
 , Hyūga-class helicopter destroyer
 , Hyūga class
 , Izumo-class helicopter destroyer
 , Izumo class

IHI Marine United Uraga shipyard
Ships built at Uraga:
 , Takanami-class destroyer
 , Murasame-class destroyer
 , a training support vessel
 , a test ship

IHI Amtec shipyard
Ships built at Aioi:
 , a civilian ship

Steel structures
IHI Infrastructure Systems Co.,Ltd., an IHI company, designs and constructs steel frame structures, bridges, and watergates.

Bridges 
Akashi-Kaikyo Bridge (Hyogo, Japan)
Tatara Bridge (Hiroshima, Japan)
Tokyo Bay Aqua-Line (Tokyo and Chiba, Japan)
Second Bosporus Bridge (Istanbul, Turkey)
Binh Bridge (Hanoi, Vietnam)
Carquinez Bridge (California, U.S.A)
 Strait of Messina Bridge (Messina, Italy, Design phase completed)
Osman Gazi Bridge (Turkey)
Auckland Harbour Bridge lane clip-on expansions (New Zealand)
Braila Bridge (Braila, Romania, Underconstruction. To be completed in 2022)

References

External links
 Official site
 English part of the official site
 Turkish part of Official site
IHI Marin Co., Ltd.
IHI Fact Sheet 2008

 
Companies established in 1853
Japanese brands
Aerospace companies
Aircraft engine manufacturers of Japan
Aerospace companies of Japan
Gas turbine manufacturers
Shipbuilding companies of Japan
Nuclear technology companies of Japan
Defense companies of Japan
Companies listed on the Tokyo Stock Exchange
Engine manufacturers of Japan
Strait of Messina Bridge
Diesel engine manufacturers
Marine engine manufacturers
Gas engine manufacturers
Turbocharger manufacturers